Leonardo Marras (born 12 January 1973, in Grosseto) is an Italian politician.

Biography 
He joined the Democratic Party of the Left in 1992 and then the Democrats of the Left, serving as mayor of Roccastrada from 1999 to 2009.

He has been a member of the Democratic Party since 2007. Marras ran for the office of President of the Province of Grosseto at the 2009 provincial elections, supported by a centre-left coalition, and won at the second round to the centre-right candidate Alessandro Antichi on 22 June. He took office on 23 June 2009.

He was elected member of the Regional Council of Tuscany in 2015.

Marras ran for the Chamber of Deputies at the 2018 general election, but was not elected.

In September 2020, he was re-confirmed member of the Regional Council of Tuscany, and was appointed assessor to economy and tourism on 22 October 2020 in the Regional Government led by president Eugenio Giani.

References

External links
 
 

1973 births
Living people
Mayors of places in Tuscany
Members of the Regional Council of Tuscany
Politicians from Grosseto
Presidents of the Province of Grosseto